A veterstrikdiploma, also known as veterdiploma (English: shoelacing diploma) is a diploma which children between 5 and 6 years can get in the Netherlands and Belgium after they manage to tie their shoelaces by themselves. It is often the first diploma a child achieves and thus has an important pedagogic meaning, giving the child their first encounter with learning and the associated rituals. 

Veterstrikdiploma is sometimes used as a derogatory term for a diploma or degree which is deemed worthless.

References

External links
Example of a veterstrikdiploma
Another example

Early childhood education in the Netherlands
Dutch culture
Belgian culture